Li Xiannian (pronounced ; 23 June 1909 – 21 June 1992) was a Chinese Communist military and political leader, president of the People's Republic of China from 1983 to 1988 under paramount leader Deng Xiaoping and then chairman of the Chinese People's Political Consultative Conference from 1988 until his death. He was a full member of the Politburo from 1956 to 1987, and of its Standing Committee from 1977 to 1987.

Li worked as an apprentice carpenter in his teenage years to support his family. He joined the Communist Party in December 1927 and became a soldier in the Chinese Red Army. After studying at the Military–Political University and the Central Party School, he became an influential and successful military commander during the Second Sino–Japanese War and the Chinese Civil War, distinguishing himself in the Huai–Hai Campaign. After the PRC was established, he served as Governor and Party Secretary of his native Hubei Province from 1949 to 1954, and then joined the central leadership in Beijing, serving as Minister of Finance (1954–1970) and Vice Premier (1954–1982). He supported Mao Zedong's designated successor, Hua Guofeng, and was named Vice Chairman of the Party (1977–1982).

One of the Eight Elders of the Communist Party, he was considered the most leftist among them, both politically and economically. Li played a key role in blocking privatizations and maintaining state control in many sectors of the economy, promoted classical Communist political and cultural values through his patronage of theorists such as Hu Qiaomu and Deng Liqun, and was instrumental in purging liberals Hu Yaobang and Zhao Ziyang. He enthusiastically advocated for the military suppression of the Tiananmen Square protests.

Biography

Early career

Born in Hong'an, Hubei, Li came from a poor family and spent his teenage years working at a carpenter's shop. He joined the Chinese Communist Party in December 1927, and served as an army captain and political commissar for the Chinese Red Army during the Long March. After arriving in Yan'an, he studied at the Counter-Japanese Military and Political University and at the Central Party School. He fought in both the Second Sino–Japanese War and the subsequent Chinese Civil War, especially in the Central Plains, and played a key role in many Communist victories, most significantly in the Huai–Hai Campaign.

Maoist People's Republic

After the Communists' victory in China, Li was appointed Governor and Party Secretary of his native Hubei Province from 1949 to 1954, and he also served as the commander and political commissar of the province's military garrison. Additionally, he was Vice Chairman of the PRC's Military Commission for South–Central China (overseeing military and public security forces in Guangdong, Hainan, Henan, Hubei and Hunan).

In 1954, Li joined the central leadership in Beijing and became China's Minister of Finance. He was also appointed Vice Premier for the entire period of 1954–1982. Despite losing his job as Finance Minister in 1970, during the Cultural Revolution, he nonetheless enjoyed Zhou Enlai's protection and was the only civilian official to serve without interruption alongside Zhou throughout the 1966–1976 Cultural Revolution decade. In 1976, Li played an instrumental role in destroying the Gang Of Four. After the demise of the Gang, Li was appointed Vice Chairman of the Chinese Communist Party and a member of the Central Military Commission.

Post-Mao politician
When Chairman Hua Guofeng rose to leadership after the death of Mao Zedong, Li became Hua's chief economic adviser and one of his main backers, along with Generals Wang Dongxing and Chen Xilian. If Hua had been successful in his efforts to achieve supreme power, Li would have become one of the most powerful officials in China, but Li's political career stalled when Deng Xiaoping eclipsed Hua as China's "Paramount leader". For the rest of his career, Li complained that his own achievements during the brief Hua interregnum were not sufficiently recognized as the basis of the progress experienced in China during the 1980s.

Li was described as an "orthodox" or "Soviet-style" communist and was a firm believer in central planning and sociopolitical conformity, so disliked Deng Xiaoping's more radical economic reform ideas. He had in fact been largely responsible for drafting the short-lived Ten Year Plan of 1978 which attempted to build a Soviet-style economy based around heavy industry and energy production. Li's ideas enjoyed strong support among some sections of the Chinese top leadership; General Yu Qiuli and his "oil clique", for example, fully supported Li.

However, Deng quickly terminated these ideas and instituted his own "go slow" approach that involved gradually allowing the development of light industry and consumer goods. He also went about assigning government posts to younger men who were followers of his ideas. One of these was Premier Zhao Ziyang, whom Li strongly opposed for being too willing to import Western ideas and move away from a planned economy. According to Zhao, Li "hated me because I was implementing Deng Xiaoping's reforms, but since it was difficult for him to openly oppose Deng, he made me the target of his opposition."

Presidency

In 1983, after the passing of a new Constitution, Li was appointed President of China at the age of 74. Although according to the 1982 Constitution the role of President was "largely ceremonial", it recognized Li's status as a respected Party elder and a member of the CCP Politburo Standing Committee, and Li himself went on to forcefully use his still very substantial influence to support leftist policies. In 1984, Li met with U.S. President Ronald Reagan during the latter's visit to China, notably discussing the status of Taiwan with the President. Li visited the United States in July 1985, the first time the head of state of the People's Republic of China made such a visit.

As the decade progressed, Deng Xiaoping, always an opponent of lifetime tenure in office, gradually convinced most of the party elders to retire. Li stepped down as president in 1988 and was succeeded by Yang Shangkun. Li was then named Chairman of the National Committee of the CPPCC. He was a strong supporter of Jiang Zemin's rise to power, and during the Tiananmen Square protests of 1989, Li was one of the hardline Party elders who pushed for a strong response to the demonstrations and supported Premier Li Peng's desire to use military force to suppress the protests. Li continued to serve in government until his death in 1992.

Family
Li had four children. His youngest daughter, Li Xiaolin, is the President of the Chinese People's Association for Friendship with Foreign Countries. She is a member of the CPPCC national committee.

Death and later commemoration
Li died on 21 June 1992 at the age of 82, two days shy of his 83rd birthday. His funeral was held on 27 June 1992 and was attended by members of the Politburo Standing Committee. After the service, Li was cremated.

Awards and honors
 Order of the Star of the Romanian Socialist Republic, 1st Class (Romania, 1984)

References

Further reading

 Frankel, Benjamin. The Cold War 1945-1991. Vol. 2, Leaders and other important figures in the Soviet Union, Eastern Europe, China and the Third World (1992) pp 191–92.
 Yang, Yutong. "Li Xiannian." in China at War: An Encyclopedia (2012) p 225.

|-

|-

|-

|-

|-

|-

|-

1909 births
1992 deaths
 
Chinese Communist Party politicians from Hubei
Politicians from Huanggang
Presidents of the People's Republic of China
People's Republic of China politicians from Hubei
Governors of Hubei
Ministers of Finance of the People's Republic of China
Chairpersons of the National Committee of the Chinese People's Political Consultative Conference
20th-century Chinese politicians
Members of the 12th Politburo Standing Committee of the Chinese Communist Party
Members of the 11th Politburo Standing Committee of the Chinese Communist Party
Members of the 10th Politburo of the Chinese Communist Party
Members of the 9th Politburo of the Chinese Communist Party
Members of the 8th Politburo of the Chinese Communist Party
Burials at Babaoshan Revolutionary Cemetery
Spouses of Chinese politicians
Recipients of the Order of the Star of the Romanian Socialist Republic